Kailee Nicole Moore (born July 15, 1998), professionally known as Kailee Morgue, is an American singer-songwriter.

Career 
Kailee first began posting on her YouTube channel in late 2015, and started with covers of songs. Her most popular cover being "Spirit Desire" by Tigers Jaw. In January 2017, Morgue tweeted a preview of "Medusa" that went viral. Later that year, Morgue signed a deal with Republic Records. A music video for "Medusa" was released in October 2017. She worked with producer CJ Baran to develop a final version of the song. Morgue performed at her first music festival, Outside Lands Music and Arts Festival in August 2018. In 2018, Morgue released the single "Siren" continuing the Greek mythology theme to her songs such as "Medusa."

Artistry 
Highsnobiety described Morgue as a mix of goth and punk. She cites Gwen Stefani and Avril Lavigne as early influences. Atwood Magazine described Morgue's singing as a mixture of light and dark "like a dream within a nightmare, or vice versa."

Reception 
Sydney Gore of MTV called Morgue an "emerging pop star" after the release of her EP, Medusa.

Discography

Albums 
 Girl Next Door (2022)

Extended plays 
 Medusa (2018)
 Here in Your Bedroom (2020)

Other recordings 

 "Unfortunate Soul"
 "Ghost of Mine"
 "F**K U"
 "Discovery"
 "Intuition"

Singles

 "June"
 "Signs"
 "Medusa" (2017)
 "Do You Feel This Way"
 "Siren"
 "Headcase" featuring Hayley Kiyoko
 "Knew You" (2020)
 "Butterflies" (2021)
 "Another Day In Paradise" (2022)
 "Loser" (2022)
 "Trainwreck" (2022)

Personal life 
Morgue is based in Los Angeles. She is openly queer and pansexual. She practices witchcraft. Her favorite fictional character is Sailor Moon.

References

External links

Living people
Musicians from Phoenix, Arizona
21st-century American singers
American women singer-songwriters
American women pop singers
Republic Records artists
21st-century American women singers
1998 births
American LGBT singers
Queer women
Queer musicians
LGBT people from Arizona
Pansexual musicians
Singer-songwriters from Arizona